Chilorhinophis butleri, also known commonly as Butler's black-and-yellow burrowing snake and  Butler's two-headed snake, is a species of venomous snake in the family Atractaspididae. The species is endemic to East Africa.

Geographic range
C. butleri is found in Mozambique, South Sudan, and Tanzania.

Etymology
The specific name, butleri, is in honor of English zoologist Arthur Lennox Butler (1873–1939), who was the son of Edward Arthur Butler.

Habitat

Behavior
C. butleri burrows in soft, sandy soils and leaf litter.

Diet
C. butleri is known to prey upon amphisbaenians, and it may also eat snakes.

Reproduction
C. butleri is oviparous.

References

Further reading
Spawls S, Howell K, Hinkel H, Menegon M (2018). Field Guide to East African Reptiles, Second Edition. London: Bloomsbury Natural History. 624 pp. . (Chilorhinophis butleri, p. 465).
Werner F (1907). "Ergebnisse der mit Subvention aus der Erbschaft Treitl unternommenen zoologischen Forschungreise Dr. Franz Werner's in den ägyptischen Sudan und nach Nord-Uganda. XII. Die Reptilien und Amphibien ". Sitzungsberichte der Mathematisch-Naturwissenschaftlichen Klasse der Kaiserlichen Akademie der Wissenschaften [Vienna] 116: 1823-1926 + Plates I-IV. (Chilorhinophis butleri, new species, p. 1881 + Plate III, figures 8a-8d). (in German).

Atractaspididae
Reptiles described in 1907